Keelung, Chilung or Jilong, officially known as Keelung City, is a major port city situated in the northeastern part of Taiwan. With 361,082 inhabitants, the city forms a part of the Taipei–Keelung metropolitan area with its neighboring New Taipei City and Taipei.

Before the city was founded by the Spanish Empire in 1626, then called La Santisima Trinidad, present-day Keelung was inhabited by Taiwanese indigenous peoples and was part of Spanish and Dutch colonial rule before being subsumed into the Qing dynasty in 1683 as part of Fujian. The city became a flashpoint of the First Opium War and the Keelung Campaign in the Sino-French War. Taiwan was detached from Fujian in 1887 and Keelung became part of the Empire of Japan in 1895 following the First Sino-Japanese War. During the Japanese era, the city was known as Kirun first as a town of Taihoku Prefecture, then became a district in 1920 and finally a city in 1924. After World War II in 1945, the Republic of China, which deposed the Qing several years before, reestablished Keelung as a provincial city of Taiwan Province, which would later became streamlined from 1998.

Nicknamed the Rainy Port for its frequent rain and maritime role, the city is Taiwan's second largest seaport (after Kaohsiung) and the 7th largest in the world.

Name 
According to early Chinese accounts, this northern coastal area was originally called Pak-kang. By the early 20th century, the city was known to the Western world as Kelung, as well as the variants Kiloung, Kilang and Keelung. In his 1903 general history of Taiwan, US Consul to Formosa (1898–1904) James W. Davidson related that "Kelung" was among the few well-known names, thus warranting no alternate Japanese romanization.

However, the Taiwanese people have long called the city Kelang. While it has been proposed that this name was derived from the local mountain that took the shape of a rooster cage, it is more likely that the name was derived from the first inhabitants of the region, as are the names of many other Taiwanese cities. In this case, the Ketagalan people were the first inhabitants, and early Han settlers probably approximated "Ketagalan" with Ke-lâng (Ketagalan: ke-, "domain marker prefix" + Taiwanese Hokkien ), the noun root being replaced with the common Taiwanese Hokkien term for people, while the domain marker circumfix "ke- -an" being reduced to just the prefix.

In 1875, during the late Qing era, a new official name was given. In Mandarin, probably the working language of Chinese government at the time, both the old and new names were likely pronounced Gīlóng (hence "Keelung").

Under Japanese rule (1895–1945), the city was also known to the west by the Japanese romanization Kīrun (also written as Kiirun).

In Taiwanese Hokkien, native language of the area, the city is called Ke-lâng. In Hanyu Pinyin, a system created for Mandarin Chinese in Mainland China, the name of Keelung is written as Jīlóng (the shift from initial K to J is a recent development in the Beijing dialect, see Old Mandarin).

History

Early history
Keelung was first inhabited by the Ketagalan, a tribe of Taiwanese aborigine. The Spanish expedition to Formosa in the early 17th century was its first contact with the West; by 1624 the Spanish had built San Salvador de Quelung, a fort in Keelung serving as an outpost of the Manila-based Spanish East Indies. The Spanish ruled it as a part of Spanish Formosa. From 1642 to 1661 and 1663–1668, Keelung was under Dutch control. The Dutch East India Company took over the Spanish Fort San Salvador at Santissima Trinidad. They reduced its size and renamed it Fort Noort-Hollant. The Dutch had three more minor fortifications in Keelung and also a little school and a preacher.

When Ming dynasty loyalist Koxinga successfully attacked the Dutch in southern Taiwan 
(Siege of Fort Zeelandia), the crew of the Keelung forts fled to the Dutch trading post in Japan. The Dutch came back in 1663 and re-occupied and strengthened their earlier forts. However, trade with Qing China through Keelung was not what they hoped it would be and, in 1668, they left after getting harassed by aboriginals.

Qing dynasty

First Opium War

Given the strategic and commercial value of Taiwan, there were British suggestions in 1840 and 1841 to seize the island. In September 1841, during the First Opium War, the British transport ship Nerbudda became shipwrecked near Keelung Harbour due to a typhoon. The brig Ann also became shipwrecked in March 1842. Most of the crew were Indian lascars. Survivors from both ships were transferred by authorities to the capital Tainan. The Taiwan Qing commanders, Ta-hung-ah and Yao Ying, filed a disingenuous report to the emperor, claiming to have defended against an attack from the Keelung fort. In October 1841, HMS Nimrod sailed to Keelung to search for the Nerbudda survivors, but after Captain Joseph Pearse found out that they were sent south for imprisonment, he ordered the bombardment of the harbour and destroyed 27 sets of cannon before returning to Hong Kong. Most of the survivors—over 130 from the Nerbudda and 54 from the Ann—were executed in Tainan in August 1842.

In 1863, the Qing Empire opened up Keelung as a trading port and the city enjoyed rapid development due to the abundant commodities such as placer gold and high quality coal found in the drainage area of Keelung River. In 1875, Taipeh Prefecture was created and included Keelung. In 1878, Keelung was formed into a ting or sub-prefecture. Around the same time, the name was changed from Ke-lang to Kilong, which means "rich and prosperous land".

The city suffered serious damage and lost hundreds of inhabitants during an earthquake and tsunami in 1867. The earthquake had an estimated magnitude of 7.0 and was caused by movement on a nearby fault.

Sino-French War

During the Sino-French War (1884–85), the French attempted an invasion of Taiwan during the Keelung Campaign. Liu Mingchuan, who led the defence of Taiwan, recruited Aboriginals to serve alongside the Chinese soldiers in fighting against the French of Colonel Jacques Duchesne's Formosa Expeditionary Corps. The French were defeated at the Battle of Tamsui and the Qing forces pinned the French down at Keelung in an eight-month-long campaign before the French withdrew.

Empire of Japan
A systematic city development started during the Japanese Era, after the 1895 Treaty of Shimonoseki, which handed all Taiwan over to Japan. A five-phase construction of Keelung Harbor was initiated, and in by 1916 trade volume had exceeded even those of Tamsui and Kaohsiung Harbors to become one of the major commercial harbors of Taiwan.

The Pacific War broke out in 1941, and Keelung became one of the first targets of Allied bombers and was nearly destroyed as a result.

Republic of China
After the handover of Taiwan from Japan to the Republic of China in October 1945, Keelung was established as a provincial city of Taiwan Province. The Keelung City Government worked with the harbor bureau to rebuild the city and the harbor and by 1984, the harbor became the 7th largest container harbor in the world. The city became directly governed by the Executive Yuan after Taiwan Province was streamlined in 1998 and became a de facto first level division in 2018 following the dissolution of the Taiwan Provincial Government.

Geography

Keelung City is located in the northern part of Taiwan Island. The northern part of the city faces the ocean and is a great deep water harbor since early times. Keelung also administers the nearby Keelung Islet as well as the more distant and strategically important Pengjia Islet, Mianhua Islet and Huaping Islet.

Climate
It has long been noted as one of the wettest and gloomiest cities in the world; the effect is related to the Kuroshio Current. Although it is one of the coolest cities of Taiwan, winters are still short and warm, whilst summers are long, relatively dry and hot, temperatures can peek above 26 °C during a warm winter day, while it can dip below 27 °C during a rainy summer day, much like the rest of northern Taiwan. However its location on northern mountain slopes means that due to orographic lift, rainfall is heavier during fall and winter, the latter during which a northeasterly flow prevails. During summer, southwesterly winds dominate and thus there is a slight rain shadow effect. Fog is most serious during winter and spring, when relative humidity levels are also highest.

Administration

Zhongzheng District is the seat of Keelung City which houses the Keelung City Government and Keelung City Council. The current Mayor of Keelung is George Hsieh of the Kuomintang.

Administrative divisions
Keelung has seven (7) districts:

Politics
Keelung City voted one Democratic Progressive Party legislator Tsai Shih-Ying to be in the Legislative Yuan during the 2016 Republic of China legislative election.

Demographics

Population growth

Festivals
One of the most popular festivals in Taiwan is the mid-summer Ghost Festival. The Keelung Ghost Festival is among the oldest in Taiwan, dating back to 1851 after bitter clashes between rival clans, which claimed many lives before mediators stepped in.

Economy
Coal mining peaked in 1968. The city developed quickly and by 1984, the harbor was the 7th largest container harbor in the world.

Education

Education in Keelung City is governed by the Department of Education of Keelung City Government.

Universities and colleges
Keelung City houses several universities and colleges, such as the National Taiwan Ocean University, Ching Kuo Institute of Management and Health and Chungyu Institute of Technology.

High schools
 National Keelung Maritime Vocational High School
 Keelung Fu Jen Sacred Heart Senior High School

Energy

Keelung City houses the only fully oil-fired power plant in Taiwan, the Hsieh-ho Power Plant, which is located in Zhongshan District. The installed capacity of the power plant is 2,000 MW.

Tourist attractions

Ports
Badouzi Fishing Port
Bisha Fishing Port
Port of Keelung
Zhengbin Fishing Port

Parks
Zhongzheng Park
Heping Island Park

Cultural centers
Embrace Cultural and Creative Park
Keelung Cultural Center
Keelung City Indigenous Cultural Hall

Museums
National Museum of Marine Science and Technology.

Historical structures
Baimiweng Fort, Dawulun Fort, Gongzi Liao Fort, Keelung Fort Commander's Official Residence, Nuannuan Ande Temple, Pengjia Lighthouse, Uhrshawan Battery and Xian Dong Yan.

Transportation

Rail
Taiwan Railways Administration: Keelung, Sankeng, Badu, Qidu, Baifu, Nuannuan, Haikeguan, Badouzi
Taiwan High Speed Rail: Keelung does not have a HSR station, but HSR services can be accessed from Nangang station in Nangang District, located in the eastern part of Taipei.

Water
Taiwan's second largest port, the Port of Keelung, is located in the city. The port serves for destinations to Matsu Islands, Xiamen and Okinawa.

International relations

Twin towns – Sister cities
Keelung is twinned with:
 Bacolod and Davao City, Philippines
 Bikini Atoll, Marshall Islands
 Campbell, California, U.S.
 Corpus Christi, Texas, U.S.
 East London, South Africa
 Marrickville, New South Wales, Australia
 Miyakojima, Okinawa, Japan
 Rosemead, California, U.S.
 Salt Lake City, Utah, U.S.
 Sangju, North Gyeongsang, South Korea
 Thunder Bay, Ontario, Canada
 Yakima, Washington, U.S.

Notable people
Notable people from Keelung include:

 Chen Ti, Taiwanese tennis player
 Zero Chou, Taiwanese director
 Jiang Yi-huah, Premier of the Republic of China
 Show Lo, Taiwanese entertainer
 Danson Tang, Taiwanese Mandopop singer
 Yi Huan, Taiwanese comic creator/animator
 Feng-hsuing Hsu, American-Taiwanese computer scientist
 Hsie Zhen-Wu, Taiwanese TV presenter/lawyer

See also

 Asteroid 237164 Keelung named for the city in 2018
 List of cities in the Republic of China (Taiwan)
 Administrative divisions of the Republic of China

References

External links 

  
  
 WorldStatesmen.org — Taiwan
 

 
Port cities and towns in Taiwan
Taiwan placenames originating from Formosan languages
Provincial cities of Taiwan
Weather extremes of Earth